Rein Kotov (born 17 February 1965 in Raasiku, Harju County) is an Estonian film operator and film editor.

In 1991 he graduated from Gerasimov Institute of Cinematography.

1985-1993 he worked at Tallinnfilm. After that he is worked primarily for Allfilm.

In 2014 he was awarded with Order of the White Star, IV class.

Filmography

 2015 "1944" (feature film; operator)
 2015 "Tiibadeta piloot" (feature film; operator)
 2016 "Luuraja ja luuletaja" (feature film; operator)
 2018 "Seltsimees laps" (feature film; operator) 	
 2019 "Tõde ja õigus" (feature film; operator)

References

Living people
1965 births
Estonian cinematographers
Estonian film editors
Recipients of the Order of the White Star, 4th Class
People from Raasiku Parish